Sangría Señorial is a sangria-flavored, non-alcoholic beverage produced by Mezgo S.A de C.V in Mexico since 1960.

Description
It is made with wine grapes, essence of lemon, cane sugar, and carbonated water. It has been distributed in the United States by Novamex, the producers of Jarritos soft drinks, since 1982.

References

External links
Sangria Señorial webpage

Non-alcoholic drinks
Mexican drinks